Scrobipalpa erichiodes is a moth in the family Gelechiidae. It was described by Oleksiy V. Bidzilya and Hou-Hun Li in 2010. It is found in China in Gansu, Hebei, Heilongjiang, Ningxia, Inner Mongolia, Shaanxi and Xinjiang.

The forewings are covered with light-grey brown-tipped scales. There is a large black spot at one-third and a small black spot at two-thirds length of the costal margin. There is also a diffused black spot at the base near the posterior margin and there are two small black dots at the base of the cell and large black spot, sometimes separated into two small dots, at the corner of the cell.

The larvae have been recorded feeding on Lycium barbarum.

Etymology
The species name refers to the close relationship with Scrobipalpa erichi.

References

Scrobipalpa
Moths described in 2010